Victor Muzadi (born 22 June 1978 in Gabon) is a retired Angolan professional basketball player. A former member of the Angola national basketball team, Muzadi took part in the 2000 Summer Olympics, 2002 World basketball championships in Indianapolis 2004 Summer Olympics, FIBA Africa Championship 2005 and at the FIBA Africa Championship 2007.

He last played for Angolan side ASA at the Angolan basketball league BAI Basket.

Personal
Born in Gabon in 1978, Muzadi's family left the country as refugees, moving to Angola.

Professional
Muzadi began his professional career at Primeiro de Agosto, where he played from 1998 to 2006. He then joined Petro Atlético, where he played until 2008. In 2005, Muzadi played for the Dallas Mavericks in NBA's Summer League, appearing in 4 games. After failing to enter the NBA, his performance levels deteriorated and he has never been able to perform at the highest level again.

References

External links
 
 Victor Muzadi Yahoo! Sports

1978 births
Living people
Sportspeople from Libreville
Angolan men's basketball players
Angolan expatriate basketball people in the United States
Basketball players at the 2000 Summer Olympics
Basketball players at the 2004 Summer Olympics
Basketball players at the 2008 Summer Olympics
Gabonese men's basketball players
Olympic basketball players of Angola
Power forwards (basketball)
Atlético Petróleos de Luanda basketball players
Atlético Sport Aviação basketball players
C.D. Primeiro de Agosto men's basketball players
G.D. Interclube men's basketball players
African Games gold medalists for Angola
African Games medalists in basketball
2002 FIBA World Championship players
Competitors at the 2007 All-Africa Games
21st-century Gabonese people